The 2023 Nigerian presidential election in Niger State will be held on 25 February 2023 as part of the nationwide 2023 Nigerian presidential election to elect the president and vice president of Nigeria. Other federal elections, including elections to the House of Representatives and the Senate, will also be held on the same date while state elections will be held two weeks afterward on 11 March.

Background
Niger State is a large, diverse state in the North Central with agricultural and energy potential but facing a debilitated health sector and intense challenges in security as the nationwide kidnapping epidemic, bandit conflict, and herder–farmer clashes have all heavily affected the state with added fears of ISWAP encroachment.

Politically, the state's 2019 elections were a solidification of the control of the state APC. In federal elections, Buhari retained the state presidentially while the APC swept all three senate seats and ten House of Representatives seats. On the state level, the party also held the governorship and kept the majority in the House of Assembly.

Polling

Projections

General election

Results

By senatorial district 
The results of the election by senatorial district.

By federal constituency
The results of the election by federal constituency.

By local government area 
The results of the election by local government area.

See also 
 2023 Niger State elections
 2023 Nigerian presidential election

Notes

References 

Niger State gubernatorial election
2023 Niger State elections
Niger